Kantadih railway station is a railway station on Purulia–Tatanagar line of Adra railway division of Indian Railways' South Eastern Railway zone. It is situated beside National Highway 32 at Kantadi in Purulia district in the Indian state of West Bengal. Number of local and passenger train stop at Kantadih railway station.

History
The Bengal Nagpur Railway was formed in 1887 for the purpose of upgrading the Nagpur Chhattisgarh Railway. Purulia–Chakradharpur rail line was opened on 22 January 1890. The Purulia–Chakradharpur rout including Kantadih railway station was electrified in 1961–62.

References

Adra railway division
Railway stations in Purulia district
1890 establishments in India